The Plaza Shopping Centre is a shopping mall in the central area of Palmerston North, New Zealand owned by Kiwi Property. It is the largest shopping mall in the Manawatu region.

History

The mall opened in 1986 as the PDC Plaza. The Premier Drapery Company (PDC) was a major department store in Palmerston North, owned by the Manawatu Co-Operative Society. The mall was developed around the PDC department store in response to the trend away from department stores towards shopping malls. Declining turnover coupled with the 1987 stock market crash saw PDC and the Co-Operative Society go into receivership in 1988, and the mall and department store were sold off. The PDC department store was closed and demolished in 1990 to make way for an extension of the mall.

Redevelopment was done in three stages. The first stage opened in March 2009 with a new food court, a multi-level carpark and 15 new specialty stores. The second stage opened in September 2009 with an additional 10 specialty stores. The third stage opened March 2010 with the addition of 32 specialty stores, a two-storey  Farmers department store and another multi-level carpark.

References

External links 

 Official site

Buildings and structures in Palmerston North
Shopping malls established in 1986
Shopping centres in New Zealand
1980s architecture in New Zealand